Yevgeni Sergeyevich Losev (born 3 February 1979) is a Russian professional football manager and a former player. He is an assistant coach with FC Kaluga.

Club career
He made his debut in the Russian Premier League in 2002 for FC Shinnik Yaroslavl.

References

1979 births
People from Ferzikovsky District
Living people
Russian footballers
FC Shinnik Yaroslavl players
FC Khimki players
FC Ural Yekaterinburg players
FC Salyut Belgorod players
Russian Premier League players
FC Volgar Astrakhan players
FC Oryol players
FC Lokomotiv Kaluga players
Russian football managers
Association football forwards
Association football midfielders
FC Baltika Kaliningrad players
FC Dynamo Bryansk players
FC Tekstilshchik Ivanovo players
Sportspeople from Kaluga Oblast